Javanism is the Javanese folk religion originally practiced in the central and eastern hemisphere of Java.

Javanism may refers to:

 Kapitayan, monotheistic Javanism
 Kejawen, polytheistic Javanism